The Uniform Power of Attorney Act (2006) (UPOAA) was a law proposed by the National Conference of Commissioners on Uniform State Laws (ULC) to create a uniform framework for power of attorney provisions throughout the United States.

History 
Historically, issues surrounding powers of attorney were based on the common law concept of agency. However, as states began enacting varying statutes to create a statutory framework for the durable powers of attorney, variations from state to state prompted support for a uniform law.

In 1969, the ULC promulgated the Uniform Probate Code, which created a basis for a national framework for powers of attorney. However, since a normal power of attorney ends once its purpose has been fulfilled or the principle is incapacitated, states made a distinction between this normal power of attorney and a durable power of attorney, which "remains in effect even when the principal becomes incapacitated." This prompted to ULC to create a uniform law regarding Durable Power of Attorney, which superseded the original Uniform Probate Code.

Act 
The UPOAA was designed to correct shortcomings of both the Uniform Probate Code and the Durable Power of Attorney by superseding them both. It consisted of four distinct articles:

 The general rules governing the "creation and use" of power of attorney
 The definitions used by the UPOAA
 An optional form for use in granting power of attorney
 Other miscellaneous provisions regarding the UPOAA and other power of attorney laws

Adoption 
The ULC officially approved of the UPOAA and recommend that states adopt it in 2006.

As of 2019, 26 states have adopted and enacted the UPOAA.

See also 
 Uniform Act
 List of Uniform Acts (United States)
Power of attorney

References

External links 
UNIFORM POWER OF ATTORNEY ACT - As drafted and approved by the ULC, with comments (pdf)
UNIFORM POWER OF ATTORNEY ACT  - As drafted and approved by the ULC, no comments (doc)
Uniform Law Commission - website

Uniform Acts
Power of attorney
Wills and trusts
United States trusts law